Ghosts of the Great Highway is the debut studio album by San Francisco quartet Sun Kil Moon, led by Red House Painters' founder Mark Kozelek, who composed all of the lyrics and music on this album. The other members are Anthony Koutsos (former drummer for Red House Painters), Geoff Stanfield, and Tim Mooney.

Three of the album's songs are named after boxers, following on from "Find Me, Rubén Olivares" from Kozelek's debut solo EP Rock 'n' Roll Singer.  The band name is also a pun on the Korean boxer Sung-Kil Moon. The opening number is named after Judas Priest guitarist Glenn Tipton. The song "Pancho Villa" is a more luscious arrangement of "Salvador Sanchez".

Ghosts of the Great Highway was re-issued as a double CD on February 6, 2007 on Kozelek's own label, Caldo Verde Records. The second disc features 6 bonus tracks, including two versions of Leonard Bernstein's "Somewhere," and the instrumental track "Arrival," which was originally recorded for the movie The Girl Next Door. The songs "Carry Me Ohio" and "Lily and Parrots" were featured in the film Shopgirl, in which Kozelek made a cameo appearance.

The song "Carry Me Ohio" was listed at #462 on Pitchforks Top 500 Songs of the 2000s list.

Reception

Upon its release, Ghosts of the Great Highway received critical acclaim. At Metacritic, which assigns a weighted average score out of 100 to reviews and ratings from mainstream critics, the album has received a metascore of 84, based on 18 reviews, indicating "universal acclaim."

Track listing

Singles
"Duk Koo Kim" (Mark Kozelek solo) (September 15, 2003)
 Limited edition 10" vinyl single (limited to 2,000 copies worldwide), features acoustic studio version and live version.

References

External links
 The official Sun Kil Moon website
 Unofficial Sun Kil Moon website
 Jetset Records

2003 debut albums
Sun Kil Moon albums
Caldo Verde Records albums
Albums produced by Mark Kozelek
Cultural depictions of boxers